Raymond Herman "Ray" Mordt (born 15 February 1957 in Cape Town, South Africa) is a Zimbabwean/South African rugby footballer who represented his country in rugby union before moving to English professional rugby league club, Wigan, with whom he won the Championship during the 1986–87 season. He is the uncle of England Sevens player Nils Mordt.

Playing career

Rugby union
Mordt grew up and started playing rugby in Rhodesia (now Zimbabwe). He went to Churchill High School in Salisbury. He played Wing for the Springboks where he captained the team 3 times (twice as a substitute) from 1980 until 1984. He made his début against the South American Jaguars on 26 April 1980 at the Wanderers Stadium in Johannesburg. South Africa won the game 24–9. As a player, he may be best known for scoring 3 tries against the All Blacks in the famous "flour bomb" Test at Eden Park in Auckland, New Zealand on 12 September 1981. South Africa lost the game 25–22. Ray Mordt played a total of 18 tests (plus 7 tour games) for the Springboks, scoring 12 tries for a total of 48 points.

Mordt played Currie Cup rugby for Zimbabwe, Transvaal and Northern Transvaal and scored 35 career tries.

Test history

Accolades

During his rugby union playing career Mordt was nominated for the SA Rugby Young Player of the Year in 1978 and SA Rugby Player of the Year in 1981, 1983 and 1984.

Rugby league

Baseball
Mordt also represented Rhodesia in the 1978 inter-provincial tournament in Durban, South Africa.

Coaching career
After his active career Mordt has been engaged as a coach for the Springboks and other teams. In 1994 The International Rugby Board barred Mordt from joining South Africa's tour of Wales, Scotland and Ireland as a fitness instructor because of his time spent playing rugby league.

As a coach Mordt has won the Currie Cup in 1994, coaching Transvaal. He was also a crucial cog in the 1995 Rugby World Cup-winning coaching set-up of Kitch Christie.

See also
List of South Africa national rugby union players – Springbok no. 501

References

1957 births
Living people
Rhodesian rugby union players
Sportspeople from Cape Town
Rugby league players from the Western Cape
Rugby league wingers
Rugby union players from Cape Town
Rugby union wings
South Africa international rugby union players
South African emigrants to Rhodesia
South African people of German descent
South African rugby league players
South African rugby union coaches
South African rugby union players
White South African people
Wigan Warriors players